Hon. Ian Ling-Stuckey, (born 27 December 1959) is a Papua New Guinean politician and Member of Parliament for the Kavieng District. He served as a member of the National Alliance Party until joining the Pangu Party and the Marape Government as Treasurer in 2019.

He unseated former member Ben Micah of the People's Progress Party by 9,368 votes to Micah's 6,713 votes to claim the Kavieng Open Seat in the 2017 elections. This is his second time to be elected as Member of Parliament for the seat. He first won in 1997, then left in 2002 to be the New Ireland Governor from 2002 to 2007 where he lost to Right Honourable Sir Julius Chan and was later re-elected in his old seat.

References

External links

http://www.pngec.gov.pg/docs/default-source/default-document-library/nominations.pdf

1959 births
Living people
Governors of New Ireland Province
People from New Ireland Province
Members of the National Parliament of Papua New Guinea
National Alliance Party (Papua New Guinea) politicians